Nectouxia is a monotypic genus of flowering plants belonging to the family Solanaceae. The only species is Nectouxia formosa. It is in the Solanoideae subfamily and in Subtribe Salpichroinae, which is a subtribe of Physaleae.

Its native range is from Texas, USA and Mexico.

The genus name of Nectouxia is in honour of Hippolyte Nectoux (1759–1836), a French botanist, botanical garden director in Santo Domingo. He was also head gardener in Fontainebleau and founded a botanical garden in Rome. The Latin specific epithet of formosa is 
derived from formosus meaning (well-)formed and/or beautiful.
Both the genus and species were first described and published in F.W.H.von Humboldt, A.J.A.Bonpland & C.S.Kunth, Nov. Gen. Sp. Vol.3 on page 10 in 1818.

References

Solanaceae
Monotypic Solanaceae genera
Plants described in 1818
Flora of Texas
Flora of Mexico